is an underground metro station located in Izumi-ku, Yokohama, Kanagawa, Japan operated by the Yokohama Municipal Subway’s Blue Line (Line 1). It is 1.6 kilometers from the terminus of the Blue Line at Shōnandai Station.

History
Shimoiida Station was opened on August 29, 1999. An ATO system has been operational at the station since January 20, 2007.  Platform screen doors were installed in September 2007.

Lines
Yokohama Municipal Subway
Blue Line (Line 1)

Station layout
Shimoiida Station has a single underground island platform.

Platforms

References
 Harris, Ken and Clarke, Jackie. Jane's World Railways 2008-2009. Jane's Information Group (2008).

External links
 Shimoiida Station (Blue Line) 

Railway stations in Kanagawa Prefecture
Railway stations in Japan opened in 1999
Blue Line (Yokohama)